Ken Kempster (born September 18, 1975) is a Canadian musician.

Kempster has played drums in the Canadian punk rock bands wedontdomuch, Shovlhead, Swell Prod., The Showbusiness Giants (1993–1997), The Hanson Brothers (1993–1997), and NoMeansNo (1993–1997, serving as second drummer for live performances and their seventh full-length album The Worldhood of the World (As Such).)

References

External links
 Official NoMeansNo and Hanson Brothers page

1975 births
Living people
Canadian rock drummers
Canadian male drummers
Musicians from Halifax, Nova Scotia
21st-century Canadian drummers
21st-century Canadian male musicians
The Hanson Brothers (band) members
Nomeansno members